2-Acetylpyridine is an organic compound with the formula .  It is a viscous colorless liquid that is widely used as a flavoring substance. It is found in malt and produced by the Maillard reaction and by nixtamalization. It contributes to the flavor of corn tortillas, popcorn, and beer. 

The compound is prepared by acylation of 2-bromopyridine via the Grignard reagent.

See also
 2-Acetyl-1-pyrroline
 6-Acetyl-2,3,4,5-tetrahydropyridine
 Terpyridine

References

External links
 The Good Scents Company
 ChemSpider

2-Pyridyl compounds
Aromatic ketones